Extempo Monarch is the title awarded to the winner of an annual extempo competition held at the Trinidad Carnival.

A number of contestants (in 2006 there were 8) compete in preliminary rounds.  The Final consists of a head-to-head contest between the two most successful performers.

In the preliminary rounds contestants must perform improvised calypso lyrics according to the conventions of the genre on topics drawn at random from a prepared list.  In the Final round the contestants improvise on the same topic.

2006 Extempo Monarch

The 2006 Final was contested by Black Sage and Sheldon John singing on the topic "Kudos To Radio Trinbago". 

The winner and Extempo Monarch 2006 was Sheldon John.

Recent Extempo Monarchs
 2007 Joseph "Lingo" Vautor-La Placeliere
 2008 Joseph "Lingo" Vautor-La Placeliere
 2009 Joseph "Lingo" Vautor-La Placeliere
 2010 Winston “Gypsy” Peters
 2011 Sheldon John
 2012 Lady Africa (Leslie Ann Bristow)
 2013 Lady Africa (Leslie Ann Bristow)
 2014 Brian London
 2015 Joseph "Lingo" Vautor-La Placeliere
 2016 Winston “Gypsy” Peters
 2017 Winston “Gypsy” Peters 
2018 Myron "Incredible Myron B" Bruce 
2019 Brian London 
2020 Brian London 
2023 Brian London

See also 
 Calypso music
 Extempo
 Trinidad Carnival
 International Soca Monarch

References

External links 
 Trinidad Express: coverage of 2006 competition
 Copyright Music Organisation of Trinidad & Tobago: list of 2006 Carnival Winners

Trinidad and Tobago music
Trinidad and Tobago culture
Carnivals